Trevor Mark Smith (born 18 January 1977) is a former English cricketer  who played first-class cricket for Derbyshire from 1997 to 2001 and  also for Suffolk.

An instant cricketing hit, he achieved a bowling performance of 8/38 in his second First-class appearance. He finished the 1998 season, with promising bowling average of 23, and performed even better the following year, with an average of only 21.

However, he suffered a bone spur injury soon after he hit peak form, and despite his average declining dramatically, he made his only career half-century in the 2000 season. With good control of line and length, it was a surprise that Derbyshire released him the following year.  He was a left-handed batsman and a right-arm medium-pace bowler.

He most recently appeared for Suffolk in the 2005 Minor Counties Championship.

External links
Trevor Smith at Cricket Archive 

1977 births
English cricketers
Living people
Derbyshire cricketers
Suffolk cricketers
Derbyshire Cricket Board cricketers